The Yetagon gas field is an offshore gas field in the Andaman Sea. Following the Yadana project, the US$700 million Yetagun ("Flag of victory") project was the second natural gas offshore project in Myanmar.

Description
About  of the pipelines is undersea, and the rest of it is onshore, where it links with the Yadana pipeline. Also, Yetagun could produce eight to nine thousand barrels of gas condensate per day.

History
The Yetagun gas field was a joint venture between Texaco (50%), Premier Oil (30%), and Nippon Oil (20%).  After Texaco withdrew in 1997 and Premier Oil withdrew in 2002, Petronas became the operator.

In 2008, the Yetagun gas pipeline had a problem with leaking, causing a loss of 400-500 million cubic feet per day (cfd) to Thailand.

In 2011, a helicopter hired by Petronas to work at Yetagun crashed in the Andaman Sea, killing 3 people while 11 people survived.

Controversy
Some controversy exists regarding the Yetagun (and Yadana) pipeline since some of the profits go to the Burmese government which has a poor human rights record. Also, the main export pipeline runs through an area associated with the Mon and Karen ethnic minorities. There have also been reports of forced labor to build a railway to the pipeline terminus. Furthermore, some are concerned about the environmental impact the pipelines will have on forests.

Though Texaco sold its shares for ostensibly commercial reasons, some believe that the US government’s sanctions on investments in Burma contributed to their withdrawal. Similarly in 2002, when Premier withdrew, activists claimed victory in a 10-year-long campaign against the company’s activity, whereas Premier insisted it pulled out due to commercial interests.

See also
Yadana gas field

References

External links
Premier's Description of the Yetagun Project

Natural gas fields in Myanmar
Natural gas fields in Thailand